George Jarvis may refer to:

 George Jarvis (cricketer) (1800–1880), English cricketer
 George Jarvis (footballer) (1889–1969), Scottish footballer
 George Jarvis (Philhellene) (1797–1828), American Philhellene who took part in the Greek Revolution
 George A. Jarvis (1806–1893), American businessman and philanthropist
 George Stephen Benjamin Jarvis (1797–1878), judge and political figure in Upper Canada